The rapid sand filter or rapid gravity filter is a type of filter used in water purification and is commonly used in municipal drinking water facilities as part of a multiple-stage treatment system.

Rapid sand filters were first developed in the 1890s, and improved designs were developed by the 1920s. The first modern rapid sand filtration plant was designed and built by George W. Fuller in Little Falls, New Jersey. Rapid sand filters were widely used in large municipal water systems by the 1920s, because they required smaller land areas compared to slow sand filters.

Design and operation 
Rapid sand filters are typically designed as part of multi-stage treatment systems used by large municipalities. These systems are complex and expensive to operate and maintain, and therefore less suitable for small communities and developing nations. The filtration system requires a relatively small land area in proportion to the population served, and the design is less sensitive to changes in raw water quality, e.g. turbidity, than slow sand filters.

Rapid sand filters use relatively coarse sand and other granular media to remove particles and impurities that have been trapped in a floc through the use of flocculation chemicals—typically alum. Since media other than silica sand can be used in such filters, a more modern term is "rapid filtration" instead of "rapid sand filtration." The unfiltered water flows through the filter medium under gravity or under pumped pressure and the floc material is trapped in the sand matrix.

Mixing, flocculation and sedimentation processes are typical treatment stages that precede filtration. Chemical additives, such as coagulants, are often used in conjunction with the filtration system.

The two types of rapid sand filter are the gravity type (e.g. Paterson's filter) and pressure type (e.g. Candy's filter).

A disinfection system (typically using chlorine or ozone) is commonly used following filtration. Rapid sand filtration has very little effect on taste and smell and dissolved impurities of drinking water, unless activated carbon is included in the filter medium.

Rapid sand filters must be cleaned frequently, often several times a day, by backwashing, which involves reversing the direction of the water and adding compressed air. During backwashing, the bed is fluidized and care must be taken not to wash away the media.

The byproduct of backwashing is sludge which is either tankered away or is run to waste if the composition is within the tolerable limits. These tanks are known as "Dirty washwater tanks".

See also 
 Automated pool cleaner

Notes

References 

 

Water filters
Water technology